A liberty was an English unit originating in the Middle Ages, traditionally defined as an area in which regalian right was revoked and where the land was held by a mesne lord (i.e. an area in which rights reserved to the king had been devolved into private hands). It later became a unit of local government administration.

Liberties were areas of widely variable extent which were independent of the usual system of hundreds and boroughs for a number of different reasons, usually to do with peculiarities of tenure. Because of their tenurial rather than geographical origin, the areas covered by liberties could either be widely scattered across a county or limited to an area smaller than a single parish: an example of the former is Fordington Liberty, and of the latter, the Liberty of Waybayouse, both in Dorset.

In northern England, the liberty of Bowland was one of the larger tenurial configurations covering some ten manors, eight townships and four parishes under the sway of a single feudal lord, the Lord of Bowland, whose customary title is Lord of the Fells.  Up until the Tenures Abolition Act 1660, such lords would have been lords paramount.

Legislation passed in 1836 ended the temporal jurisdiction of the Archbishop of York and the Bishop of Ely in several liberties, and the Liberties Act 1850 permitted the merging of liberties in their counties. By 1867, only a handful remained: Ely, Havering-atte-Bower, St Albans, Peterborough, Ripon and Haverfordwest. St Albans was subsequently joined to the county of Hertfordshire in 1875.

The Local Government Act 1888 led to the ending of the special jurisdictions in April 1889: the Isle of Ely and Soke of Peterborough became administrative counties, while the three remaining liberties were united to their surrounding counties.

Inner and Middle Temples
Inner Temple and Middle Temple, which occupy an area in London known as The Temple, describe themselves as liberties based on letters patent from 1608 and retain a large degree of independence to the present day. They are extra-parochial areas, historically not governed by the City of London Corporation, and are today regarded as local authorities for most purposes.

They are also outside the ecclesiastical jurisdiction of the Bishop of London. They geographically fall within the boundaries of the City of London, but can be thought of as independent enclaves.

The local government functions of the Inner and Middle Temples are allocated by the Temples Order 1971 which provides that the Sub-Treasurer of the Inner Temple and the Under-Treasurer of the Middle Temple may exercise any function of an Inner London borough defined in either of ss.1(4) or 6 London Government Act 1963 which is not expressly excepted by an Act or Order. Exceptions in the 1971 Order include various matters associated with housing, planning, public welfare and health; the effect is usually to direct such excepted powers or responsibilities to the Common Council of the City of London. The City of London Police have policed the Temples since 1857 by consent rather than by imposition.

List of liberties

 Allertonshire
 Alverstoke Liberty
 Beaulieu Liberty
 Bentley Liberty
 Liberty of Berrick Prior
 Bircholt Franchise and Barony
 Blackfriars, London
 Bolingbroke Soke
 Bowland, Forest of Bowland, Forest and Liberty of Bowland
 Breamore Liberty
 Liberty of Brickendon (Hertfordshire)
 Precinct of Bridewell
 Bridgnorth Liberty
 Chichester
 Liberty of the Clink
 Coldharbour, City of London
 Dibden Liberty
 Doncaster Soke
 List of liberties in Dorset
 The Liberties, Dublin
 Liberty of Durham
 East Medina Liberty
 East Smithfield Liberty
 Ely Place Liberty
 Ely Rents Liberty
 Liberty of Glasshouse Yard
 Grantham Soke
 Liberty of Hallamshire
 Havant Liberty
 Hatton Garden Liberty
 Haverfordwest
 Royal Liberty of Havering
 Franchise of Hexhamshire
 Horncastle Soke
 Liberty of Howdenshire
 Ipswich
 Isle of Ely
 Kingswood Liberty, Surrey
 Liberty of Langbaurgh/ Cleveland 
 Langport Liberty
 Lodsworth
 The Minories
 Liberty of the Mint, Southwark
 Soke of Mountsorrel, Leicestershire
 Liberty of Norton Folgate
 Old Artillery Ground Liberty (part of the Liberties of the Tower of London)
 Orton, Staffordshire, a liberty in Wombourne Parish
 Oxford
 Soke of Peterborough
 Pevensey Lowey
  Liberties of Priorsdale, Alston Moor
 Portsmouth and Portsea Island Liberty
 Liberty of Rufford
 Richmondshire
 Liberty of Ripon
 Romney Marsh Liberty
 Liberty of the Rolls
 Ryme Intrinseca
 Liberty of St Albans
 Liberty of St John, Midhurst 
 St Martin's le Grand
 Liberty of the Savoy (Liberty of the Duchy of Lancaster)
 Liberty of Saint Edmund
 Precinct of St Katharine
 Liberty of Saffron Hill
 Isle of Sheppey Liberty
 Shrewsbury Liberty
 Slaidburn, Manor and Liberty of Slaidburn
 Liberty of the Soke, Winchester
 Borough of Southwark
 Southwell and Scrooby
 Stoborough Liberty
 Lowey of Tonbridge
 Tower division, Liberties of the Tower of London
 Liberty of Trysull
 Liberty of Tynedale
 Wenlock Franchise
 West Medina Liberty
 Liberty of Westminster (1585-1900)
 The Liberty of Westover or West Stour
 Whitefriars, London
 Whitby Strand Liberty
 Wells St Andrew
 Wombourne Liberty

Ireland

The term "liberty" was used in Ireland after the Norman conquest.
Liberty of Leinster; later divided into the liberties of Wexford, Kilkenny, Carlow and Kildare
Liberty of Meath; later divided into the liberties of Meath and Trim
Liberty of Ulster
Liberty of the Archbishop of Dublin, which at one time covered much of Dublin city south of the River Liffey

Prison liberties
The term "liberty" was also used in England for a demarcated area in the vicinity of a prison in which convicts could live upon regular payment of fees. Examples include the Liberty of the Fleet in the City, and the Rules of the Bench in Southwark.

See also
 Northern Liberties Township, Pennsylvania

References

Former subdivisions of England